General elections were held in Belgium on 17 April 1977. The result was a victory for the Christian People's Party, which won 56 of the 212 seats in the Chamber of Representatives and 28 of the 106 seats in the Senate. Voter turnout was 95.1%. Elections were also held for the nine provincial councils and for the Council of the German Cultural Community.

Results

Chamber of Representatives

Senate

References

1977 elections in Belgium
April 1977 events in Europe